The 1996 Bangladesh coup d'état attempt was a coup attempt in Bangladesh. The coup was launched by Army Chief of Staff Abu Saleh Mohammad Nasim against the President of Bangladesh Abdur Rahman Biswas. The coup failed and the Army chief of Staff was dismissed.

Background
In February 1996 the Prime Minister of Bangladesh, Khaleda Zia held elections which were boycotted by the main opposition, Bangladesh Awami league, led by Sheikh Hasina, who had demanded the elections be held under a neutral Caretaker Government. The constitution was amended and the formation of a neutral caretaker government took place. During the period between February and June, Major General G.H. Murshed Khan and Brigadier General Hameedur Rehman had spoken against the political situation of the country. 

President Abdur Rahman Biswas asked the Chief of Staff of Bangladesh Army, Lieutenant General Abu Saleh Mohammed Nasim, to take action against the officers. Nasim refused which led the president to dismiss those officers through the defence Ministry. G. H. Morshed Khan was the GOC of Bogra Cantonment and Hameedur Rahman was the deputy chief of Bangladesh Rifles.

Coup
Lieutenant General Abu Saleh Mohammed Nasim revolted against presidential orders. He organised troops loyal to him. Nasim was placed under house arrest by troops loyal to the government and dismissed from service, after Nasim was fired on Sedition charges. 

The soldiers loyal to the government also blocked roads leading to the capital Dhaka as they might be used to bring troops loyal to General Nasim. The situation was more tense in northern Bogra Cantontment where the GOC, Major General G.H. Murshed Khan, was sacked by the president. Soldiers protected the Government TV and Radio stations. 

General Nasim was placed under the custody of Military police and held in the VIP officers' mess. Soldiers from Bogra cantonment and Mymensingh Cantonment supported General Nasim. The soldiers from Mymensingh Cantonment tried to March to Dhaka but returned to their bases when the president ordered them to do so. Troops from Bogra cantonment could not reach Dhaka, as they could not cross the Jamuna River. The other side of Jamuna River was controlled by troops from Savar Cantonment who remained loyal to the president.

Aftermath
Major General Mahbubur Rahman was appointed the new army chief by the president. Sheikh Hasina won the parliamentary election that was carried out by the Caretaker Government. General Mahbubur Rahman joined Bangladesh Nationalist Party after retirement. The failed coup strengthened the image of Bangladesh army and its willingness to support democracy.

See also
 Military coups in Bangladesh

References

1990s coups d'état and coup attempts
1996 in Bangladesh
Military coups in Bangladesh
May 1996 events in Asia
1996 in military history
1996 crimes in Bangladesh